The Muscogee County School District (MCSD) is the county government agency which operates the public schools in Muscogee County, Georgia.

The district serves as the designated school district all parts of the county, except Fort Benning, for grades K-12. Fort Benning children are zoned to Department of Defense Education Activity (DoDEA) schools for grades K-8. However high school students attend the public high schools in the respective counties they are located in. Any Fort Benning pupil, however, may attend Muscogee County schools if their parents wish, as per House Bill 224. The district does not give transportation to HB224 transfers.

History

Integration
In 1963, the district formed a special committee on desegregation. In September of that year, the school board approved a freedom of choice plan which would integrate one grade each year. In January 1964, the NAACP filed a lawsuit Lockett v. the Board of Education of Muscogee School District asserting that even with the choice plan, the district maintained an inferior school system for negroes. Superintendent Dr. William Henry Shaw testified that segregation was a "long and universal custom" and that abandoning it would "injure the feelings and physical well-being of the children." Nevertheless, in September 1968, the MCSD ruled that all grades were to be integrated through Freedom of Choice. When the federal court case U. S. v. Jefferson County Board of Education ruled that teaching staffs must also be integrated, the district agreed to assign at least two teachers who would be in the racial minority to the faculty of every school. Both teachers and students considered the goal of this time period to be more focused on survival than on education. By 1970, under the freedom of choice plan, 27 of 67 schools in the district remained completely segregated. At this time, while most of the white schools employed only the mandated two black teachers, but some of the black schools employed more white teachers. Under the threat of a cutoff of $1.8 million in federal funds, the school district integrated the schools in 1971, resulting in a 70% white student population at each school. Various changes were made to appease the different groups: for example, pictures of George Washington Carver were removed from Carver High School to soothe white students. In 1997 federal jurisdiction over the school district ended.

Board of Education
The Muscogee County Board of Education is the school district's elected governing body, and consists of nine members elected to staggered four-year terms. Eight of the members are elected from districts; one is elected at large. The Board of Education meets on the second and third Monday of each month unless the schedule is interrupted for a holiday.

Board Members
(District 1) Pat Hugley-Green 
Term ends 12-31-2024

(District 2) Nicky Tillery
Term ends 12-31- 2026

(District 3) Vanessa Jackson 
Term ends 12-31-2024

(District 4)  Naomi Buckner
Term ends 12-31-2026

(District 5) Laurie C.McCray 
Term ends 12-31-2024

(District 6) Mark Cantrell 
Term ends 12-31-2026

(District 7) Cathy Williams
Term ends 12-31-2024

(District 8) Margot Schley
Term ends 12-31-2026

(At Large) Kia Chambers
Term ends 12-31-2026

Elementary schools (Pre K–5 )
Allen Elementary School
Blanchard Elementary School
Brewer Elementary School
Britt David Elementary School
Clubview Elementary School
Davis Elementary School
Dawson Elementary School
Dimon Elementary School
Double Churches Elementary School 
Dorothy Height Elementary School
Downtown Elementary School
Eagle Ridge Academy School
Edgewood Elementary School
Forrest Road Elementary School
Fox Elementary School
Gentian Elementary School
Georgetown Elementary School
Hannan Elementary School
Johnson Elementary School
Key Elementary School
Martin Luther King Jr. Elementary School
Lonnie Jackson Academy
Mathews Elementary School
Midland Academy
North Columbus Elementary School
Reese Road Elementary School
Rigdon Road Elementary School
River Road Elementary School
South Columbus Elementary School
St. Marys Elementary School
Waddell Elementary School
Wesley Heights Elementary School
Wynnton Elementary School

Middle schools (6–8)

Aaron Cohn Middle School 
Arnold Magnet Academy
Baker Middle School
Blackmon Road Middle School
Double Churches Middle School
East Columbus Magnet Academy
Eddy Middle School
Fort Middle School
Midland Middle School
Rainey-McCullers School of the Arts
Richards Middle School
Rothschild Leadership Academy 
Veterans Memorial Middle School

High schools (9–12)

Columbus High School  
George Washington Carver High School 
Hardaway High School 
Jordan Vocational High School College and Career Academy
Kendrick High School 
Northside High School
Rainey-McCullers School of the Arts 
Shaw High School 
Spencer High School

References

External links

Education in Muscogee County, Georgia
Education in Columbus, Georgia
School districts in Georgia (U.S. state)